Sweet Dreams is a 1996 television film directed by Jack Bender, written by Bruce Miller, and starring Tiffani Amber Thiessen as a woman who has no memory of her past after waking up from a coma. The film also stars Amy Yasbeck, Adolfo Martinez and David Newsom.

Synopsis 
After waking up from a coma, Allison Sullivan finds she has no memory of anything. As she begins to try to put the pieces together she learns someone is out to get her due to an affair she had with a Dr. Jack Renault whose wife Laura just had a baby named Sara. Allison begins speaking with other people and learns all is not as it seems. She tries to put everything together and learns something strange about a person she is supposed to trust.

Cast 
 Tiffani Amber Thiessen as Allison Sullivan
 A Martinez as Chief Doug Harrison
 Amy Yasbeck as Laura Renault
 David Newsom as Dr. Jack Renault
 Conchata Ferrell as Dr. Kate Lowe
 Scott Paulin as Richard Mateo
 Natasha and Tamera McPherson as Sara Renault
 Anna Hagan as Mitzi
 Sheelah Megill as Nurse Nancy Morrison
 Merrilyn Gann as Stevie
 Biski Gugushe as Nurse Scott
 Shaina Unger as young Allison
 Chelsea Hobbs as young Laura
 Kristy Cohen as Sharon
 Laura Owens as Cynthia Levenger

Reception 
John Martin of The Daily Dispatch called it "not completely stupid".

References

External links 

1996 television films
1996 films
Films directed by Jack Bender
NBC network original films
1990s English-language films